Wait-a-minute tree, wait-a-bit tree, or wait-a-bit plant are common names for a variety of prickly plants that catch onto passers-by. These names come from the fact that the stems or other parts of the plant have numerous hooked thorns that tend to hook onto passers-by; the hooked person must stop ("wait a minute") to remove the thorns carefully to avoid injury or shredded clothing. 

These names can refer to:

 Senegalia brevispica
 Senegalia greggii
 Some species of Asparagus
 Caesalpinia decapetala
 Mimosa aculeaticarpa

See also
 Bush lawyer (plant)
Smilax australis, lawyer vine
Calamus australis, lawyer cane
 Clusia rosea, Scotch attorney
 Solanum atropurpureum, five-minute plant
 Wait-a-while